S100 calcium-binding protein P (S100P) is a protein that in humans is encoded by the S100P gene.

Function 

The protein encoded by this gene is a member of the S100 family of proteins containing 2 EF-hand calcium-binding motifs. S100 proteins are localized in the cytoplasm and/or nucleus of a wide range of cells, and involved in the regulation of a number of cellular processes such as cell cycle progression and differentiation. S100 genes include at least 13 members which are located as a cluster on chromosome 1q21; however, this gene is located at 4p16. This protein, in addition to binding Ca2+, also binds Zn2+ and Mg2+. This protein may play a role in the etiology of prostate cancer.

Interactions 

S100P has been shown to interact with EZR and RAGE. The interactions between S100P and RAGE are disrupted by  cromolyn and pentamidine.

References

Further reading 

 
 
 
 
 
 
 
 
 
 
 
 
 
 
 
 

S100 proteins